Jan Šátral was the defending champion but lost in the first round to Benjamin Bonzi.

Filip Krajinović won the title after defeating Cedrik-Marcel Stebe 6–2, 6–3 in the final.

Seeds

Draw

Finals

Top half

Bottom half

References
Main Draw
Qualifying Draw

Marburg Open - Singles
2017 Singles